Super giant slalom, or super-G, is a racing discipline of alpine skiing. Along with the faster downhill, it is regarded as a "speed" event, in contrast to the technical events giant slalom and slalom. It debuted as an official World Cup event during the 1983 season and was added to the official schedule of the World Championships in 1987 and the Winter Olympics in 1988.

Much like downhill, a super-G course consists of widely set gates that racers must pass through. The course is set so that skiers must turn more than in downhill, though the speeds are still much higher than in giant slalom (hence the name). Each athlete only has one run to clock the best time. In the Olympics, super-G courses are usually set on the same slopes as the downhill, but with a lower starting point.

History
Super-G was run as a World Cup test event during the 1982 season, with two men's races and a women's race that did not count in the season standings. 

Approved by the International Ski Federation (FIS) that summer, it was first officially run at the World Cup level in December 1982 at Val-d'Isère, France; the winner was Peter Müller of Switzerland. The first official women's super-G was run a month later in early January 1983, with consecutive events at Verbier, Switzerland. The first winner was Irene Epple of West Germany, and Cindy Nelson of the United States won the next day on a different course. 

These were the only two races for women in super-G during the 1983 season; the men had three. The event was not universally embraced during its early years, which included a boycott by two-time defending overall champion Phil Mahre in December 1982.

For the first three seasons, super-G results were added into the giant slalom discipline for the season standings; it gained separate status for a crystal globe for the 1986 season with five events for both men and women; the first champions were Markus Wasmeier and Marina Kiehl, both of West Germany.

It was added to the World Championships in 1987, held at Crans-Montana, Switzerland. Swiss skiers Pirmin Zurbriggen and Maria Walliser won gold medals to become the first world champions in the event. Super-G made its Olympic debut in 1988 in Calgary, where Franck Piccard of France and Sigrid Wolf of Austria took gold at Nakiska.

Top racers
Hermann Maier of Austria (nicknamed 'The Herminator') is widely regarded as the greatest male super-G racer, with 24 World Cup victories and five World Cup titles (1998–2001, 2004). He won the world championship in 1999 and an Olympic gold medal in 1998, three days after a crash in the downhill. 

Maier's proficiency in super-G was attributed to his thorough course inspection and his aggressive course tactics; he opted for the most direct and dangerous line down the hill. A serious motorcycle accident in August 2001 nearly resulted in an amputation of his lower right leg and sidelined him for the 2002 season, including the 2002 Olympics. After his return to the World Cup circuit in January 2003, Maier won eight more World Cup super-G events and his fifth season title in 2004.

Aksel Lund Svindal of Norway is second on the list with 17 wins in World Cup super-G races,  Kjetil Jansrud third with his 13 wins. Svindal won Olympic gold in 2010 and his fifth season title in 2014, while Zurbriggen won four consecutive season titles (1987–90) and the first world championship in 1987. 

Another notable specialist was Kjetil André Aamodt of Norway, a triple gold medalist in Olympic super-G races, winning in 1992, 2002 and 2006. Aamodt won five World Cup races and two world championship medals (silver and bronze) in the discipline. Marc Girardelli of Luxembourg, a five-time overall World Cup champion, won nine World Cup super-G events. He won season titles in every discipline except  super-G, where he was a runner-up three times. Girardelli was the silver medalist in the super-G at the 1987 World Championships and the 1992 Olympics.

On the women's side, Lindsey Vonn of the U.S. leads with 28 World Cup victories in super-G and has won five season titles (2009–2012, 2015). Katja Seizinger of Germany won five season titles in the 1990s, with 16 World Cup wins in the discipline. While neither won gold in the super-G in the Olympics (both won a bronze), they both won a world title, Vonn in 2009 and Seizinger in 1993. Renate Götschl of Austria won 17 World Cup events in super-G, three season titles (four as runner-up), and two medals (silver and bronze) in the world 
championships.

Course

Courses are normally at least  in width, but sections with lower widths are permissible if the line and terrain before and after allow it. Higher widths can also be required if deemed necessary. The distance between turning poles of successive gates must be at least . The number of direction changes must be at least 7% of the course drop in meters (6% for Olympic Winter Games, FIS World Ski Championships and FIS World Cups).

Equipment

World Cup podiums 
Men

The following table contains the men's Super-G (from 2007 Super combined) World Cup podiums since the first edition in 1986.

Women

Super G at the major competitions 
Men

Women

WOG - Winter Olympic Games, WCH - FIS World Ski Championships

See also

Alpine skiing combined
Downhill
Giant slalom
Slalom
Skiing and skiing topics
List of Olympic medalists in men's super-G
List of Olympic medalists in women's super-G
List of Paralympic medalists in men's super-G
List of Paralympic medalists in women's super-G
List of world champions in super-G

References

External links

FIS-Ski.com - results of first World Cup Super G race - Val-d'Isère- Dec-1982

Alpine skiing
Games and sports introduced in 1982